Monad may refer to:

Philosophy
 Monad (philosophy), a term meaning "unit"
Monism, the concept of "one essence" in  the metaphysical and theological theory
 Monad (Gnosticism), the most primal aspect of God in Gnosticism
 Great Monad, an older name for the taijitu symbol
 Monadologia Physica, by Immanuel Kant
 Monadology, by Gottfried Leibniz (a basic unit of perceptual reality)
  Monas Hieroglyphica, a 1564 book by John Dee describing a symbol of his own invention

Mathematics, science and technology
 Monad (biology), a historical term for a simple unicellular organism
 Monad (category theory), a construction in category theory
 Monad (functional programming), functional programming constructs that capture various notions of computation
 Monad (linear algebra), a 3-term complex
 Monad (nonstandard analysis), the set of points infinitesimally close to a given point
 Monad shell, the code name for the PowerShell command line interface for Microsoft Windows

Fictional entities
 Monads, megastructures in the 1971 Robert Silverberg novel The World Inside
 Monad Proxy, a character in the 2006 anime series Ergo Proxy
 John Monad, the title character of the 2007 television series John from Cincinnati
 Monad/Monado, a sword in the 2010 videogame Xenoblade Chronicles

Other uses
 Monad (music), a single note or pitch
 Monad University, in Hapur, Uttar Pradesh, India
 The logo of the technocracy movement

See also
 Monade
 Monadic (disambiguation)
 Monoid, in abstract algebra
 , for titles starting "Monad" or "Monadic"